Greensted is a village and former civil parish, now in the parish of Ongar, Essex, England, strung out along the Greensted Road approximately one mile to the west of Chipping Ongar. In 1961 the parish had a population of 711.

Toponymy
Greensted's full name is Greensted-juxta-Ongar. Greensted means green place, sted being in the Anglo-Saxon language, the old word for place (and is still used in modern English words e.g. 'instead', 'steadfast'). 'Juxta', from the Latin iuxta, means 'alongside'.

Greensted is situated in a large natural clearing, and would have been a logical place to build a settlement in the dense surrounding Epping Forest especially as it was near an existing route, the Ongar road, later part of the Canterbury pilgrimage mentioned in The Canterbury Tales.

History
Greensted is important because of its longevity: the parish has existed since Saxon times, and little has changed. It is also a place that has strong ties with St Edmund, King of East Anglia. King Edmund's body stayed in the church, following his death in 1013, before being moved onwards to Bury St Edmunds.

On 1 April 1965 the parish was abolished to form Ongar.

Landmarks
While very small, Greensted does have one particular feature of note, being St Andrew's Church, commonly known as Greensted Church, the oldest wooden church in the world. It was featured on a British postage stamp issued in April 1972. The east end, of brick construction, dates from the sixteenth century, while the brick footings, visible below the timber walls, are a feature of extensive restoration undertaken in the nineteenth century

See also 
 Greensted Hall

References

External links

 Greensted Network

Villages in Essex
Former civil parishes in Essex
Epping Forest District